

The American West Conference Men's Basketball Player of the Year was an annual basketball award given to the American West Conference's most outstanding player. The award was bestowed just twice (1995, 1996) coinciding with men's basketball being offered for only the 1994–95 and 1995–96 seasons. The American West Conference operated as a whole from 1993–94 to 1995–96. The award winners were Sean Allen from Southern Utah and Ben Larson from Cal Poly.

Winners

Winners by school

Footnotes

References
General

Specific

NCAA Division I men's basketball conference players of the year
Player
Awards established in 1995
Awards disestablished in 1996